Clixby is a small village in the West Lindsey district of Lincolnshire, England.

Originally a township of Caistor, it was briefly a civil parish but since 1932 forms part of the civil parish of Grasby .

Clixby is listed in the 1086 Domesday Book, with Lord of the Manor as King William I. At the beginning of the 18th century Clixby was the seat of Sir John Fitzwilliam.

The parish church was dedicated to All Hallows and dates from the 13th century with a 19th-century restoration by Hodgson Fowler. It was declared redundant in 1973.

References

External links

Villages in Lincolnshire
West Lindsey District